Wang Wei (25 December 1937 – 26 January 2023) was a Chinese scientist specializing in semiconductor.

Biography
Wang was born in Wen'an County, Hebei, on 25 December 1937. After graduating from the Department of Physics, Peking University in 1960, he was despatched to the Institute of Semiconductors, Chinese Academy of Sciences.

Personal life and death
Wang married Wu Dexin, who is also an academician of the Chinese Academy of Sciences.

Wand died on 26 January 2023, at the age of 85.

Honours and awards
 1997 Member of the Chinese Academy of Sciences (CAS)

References

External links
Wang Wei on the Institute of Semiconductors, Chinese Academy of Sciences

1937 births
2023 deaths
People from Wen'an County
Scientists from Hebei
Peking University alumni
Members of the Chinese Academy of Sciences
20th-century Chinese physicists
21st-century Chinese physicists